Pirates of the High Seas is a 1950 American adventure serial film directed by Spencer Gordon Bennet and Thomas Carr and starring Buster Crabbe, Lois Hall and Tommy Farrell.

Plot
Adventurer Jeff Drake sails to a Pacific island in aid of Kelly Walsh, an old friend whose freight line is being sabotaged by a ghost ship (such as the classic Flying Dutchman). Drake and Walsh's investigation concerns the search for Walter Castell, an escaped convict who stole 5 million dollars in diamonds at the close of World War II. Several other people, including Walsh's sister, all want to go to the island. Drake and his friends encounter multiple dangers when they are attacked by a gang also looking for the stolen diamonds led by the mysterious 'Admiral'...

Cast
 Buster Crabbe as Jeff Drake  
 Lois Hall as Carol Walsh
 Tommy Farrell as Kelly Walsh
 Gene Roth as Gov. Frederick Whitlock
 Tristram Coffin as Walter Castell (as Tris Coffin)
 Neyle Morrow as Kalana
 Stanley Price as Lamar - Whitlock's Aide
 Hugh Prosser as Roper - Jeff's First Mate [Chs.1-2,5-8]
 Symona Boniface as Lotus Lady
 William Fawcett as Ben Wharton [Chs.7-9]
 Terry Frost as Carter - Patrol 6 Henchman 
 Lee Roberts as Barker - Phantom Cruiser Henchman - [Chs.1-4]
 Rusty Wescoatt ad Adams - Phantom Cruiser Henchman
 Pierce Lyden as Durk - Patrol 6 Henchman 
 I. Stanford Jolley as Turner - Trader [Ch.1] (as Stanford Jolley)
 Marshall Reed as Shark Wilson - Phantom Cruiser Captain

Production
Pirates of the High Seas qualifies as both a sea and a jungle story, due to action taking place on uncharted islands.

Chapter titles
 Mystery Mission
 Attacked by Pirates
 Dangerous Depths
 Blasted to Atoms
 The Missing Mate
 Secret of the Ivory Case
 Captured by Savages
 The Vanishing Music Box
 Booby Trap
 Savage Snare
 Sinister Cavern
 Blast from the Depths
 Cave In
 Secret of the Music Box
 Diamonds from the Sea
Source:

References

External links

Matinee Classics – Pirates of the High Seas (1950)

1950 films
1950 adventure films
American adventure films
American black-and-white films
Columbia Pictures film serials
1950s English-language films
Films directed by Spencer Gordon Bennet
Jungle adventure films
Seafaring films
Films with screenplays by George H. Plympton
Films with screenplays by Joseph F. Poland
1950s American films